Donald S. White (April 22, 1898 – July 12, 1983) was an American college basketball player and coach. Raised in Lebanon, Indiana, White was a standout basketball player at Lebanon High School and led them to consecutive state championships in 1917 and 1918. He attended Purdue University and played for their basketball and baseball teams. As a senior in 1920–21, White led the Western Conference (now known as the Big Ten Conference) in scoring and his Boilermakers to a conference championship. He was named first-team all-Western Conference and was also declared a consensus All-American by the Helms Athletic Foundation.

White became a head coach after his playing days. He served as head coach at Washington University in St. Louis, the University of Connecticut, and Rutgers University. He won or tied seven conference regular season championships throughout his career: three at Washington University, one at Connecticut, and three at Rutgers. White compiled an overall career record of 301–332.

Internationally, White was chosen by the U.S. State Department to establish a basketball program in Thailand. He was the national basketball team head coach in the 1956 Summer Olympics, placing 15th out of 15 squads.

Head coaching record

References

1898 births
1983 deaths
All-American college men's basketball players
American expatriate basketball people in Thailand
American men's basketball players
American Olympic coaches
Baseball outfielders
Baseball players from Indiana
Basketball coaches from Indiana
Basketball players from Indiana
Guards (basketball)
People from Lebanon, Indiana
Purdue Boilermakers baseball players
Purdue Boilermakers men's basketball players
Rutgers Scarlet Knights men's basketball coaches
UConn Huskies men's basketball coaches
Washington University Bears men's basketball coaches